Daneshgah Metro Station is a station on Tabriz Metro Line 1. The station opened on 13 September 2017. It is located across from University of Tabriz, and is named after the university (Daneshgah being Persian for University).

References

Tabriz Metro stations